Tlachichuca (municipality) is a town and municipality in Puebla in south-eastern Mexico.It is the starting point for many climbers wishing to ascend Pico de Orizaba. The municipality covers an area of 459.25 km². The municipality has a total population of 7,181.

References

Municipalities of Puebla